Bede Evelyn Dominick Elwes (24 August 1931 – 5 September 1975) was an English portrait painter whose much publicised elopement with an heiress in 1957 created an international scandal.

Early life
Elwes (pronounced "El-wez") was born on 24 August 1931 at Billing Hall, Northamptonshire, to English portrait painter Simon Elwes (RA, KM), and the Hon. Gloria Rodd, daughter of Rennell Rodd, 1st Baron Rennell, some-time British Ambassador to Rome, and Conservative MP for St. Marylebone (1928–1932).

Elwes was descended from the Roman Catholic Cary-Elwes (sometimes known simply as Elwes) family, which includes such noted British prelates, priests and monks as Abbott Columba Cary-Elwes, Bishop Dudley Cary-Elwes, and Father Luke Cary-Elwes. He was the grandson of Gervase Cary Elwes (1866–1921), a diplomat and professional classical tenor, and Lady Winifride Mary Elizabeth Feilding, daughter of the 8th Earl of Denbigh. He was a nephew of the English novelist, biographer and journalist Nancy Mitford, and a godson of Evelyn Waugh. One of his cousins was Tremayne Rodd, 3rd Baron Rennell. For his early education, Elwes spent much of his childhood during the Second World War in the United States, after which he returned to England to attend Downside School in Somerset.

Elopement
At age 26, Elwes met and wished to marry 19-year-old shipping heiress Tessa Kennedy, daughter of Geoffrey Ferrar Kennedy and Daška Ivanović. Kennedy's parents, however, disapproved of the relationship and instituted wardship proceedings.

On 27 November 1957, Geoffrey Kennedy obtained a restraining order against Elwes from Justice Sir Ronald Roxburgh, barring the couple from marrying. The High Court Tipstaff was not authorised, however, to apprehend Elwes anywhere outside England or Wales. After initially attempting to marry in Scotland while being pursued by the press, Elwes and Kennedy eloped to Havana, Cuba, where they married in a civil ceremony on 27 January 1958 as guests of American mobster Meyer Lansky, who provided accommodation for them at his hotel, the Habana Riviera.

When Fidel Castro's revolution threatened the stability of the country the newlyweds fled aboard a raft with two National Geographic explorers who were sailing to Miami. From there they flew to New York City where they took out a marriage licence on 31 March. On 1 April, the couple repeated the ceremony to ensure they were legally married in Manhattan's Supreme Court officiated by Justice Henry Clay Greenberg. On 15 July, the two set sail for England aboard the liner SS Liberté docking at Southampton. The following day, accompanied by his wife and an attorney, Elwes turned himself over to authorities and was transferred to Brixton Prison where he remained for two weeks while awaiting trial for contempt of court for defying the judge's order to return Miss Kennedy to her parents. At trial the judge accepted that Elwes did love his bride but commented that every parent knows that love was not "readily convertible into bread and butter" for the support of a wife. In his ruling he directed that Elwes be released from custody but also ordered that Kennedy remain a ward of court. Elwes and Kennedy were married until the union was dissolved in London in January 1969. Elwes never remarried. He and Kennedy had three children, film producer Cassian Elwes, artist Damian Elwes, and actor Cary Elwes.

Career
In January 1960 Elwes became the assistant editor of Lilliput Magazine until its closure in July of that same year. From 1960 to 1962, he was the Company Director of Dome Press where he began the newsweekly Topic Magazine as editorial director, along with William Rees-Davies and Maurice Macmillan. While at Topic, Elwes discovered and hired a then unknown art student to be a graphic artist for the magazine, Ridley Scott, who went on to become a famous director. In 1963, together with Nicholas Luard, he published and subsequently became the director of Design Yearbook, which developed into the book-packaging firm November Books. The company's clients included Thames & Hudson, a publisher of books on art, architecture, design and visual culture. In 1964, he co-wrote a book with Luard, Refer to Drawer: Being a Penetrating Survey of a Shameful National Practice – Hustling, which included illustrations by cartoonist John Glashan. Elwes subsequently became a member of the National Union of Journalists.

Following in his father's footsteps Elwes then became a portrait painter, painting many of London's Clermont Set. Around 1967 he moved to Andalucia, Spain, where, with the aid of architect Philip Jebb, he designed a Mediterranean-style apartment complex, completed in 1970. Clients included Luard and the actor Hugh Millais. In 1975, Elwes became part owner with George Britnell of a hair salon, Figurehead, on Pont Street in Knightsbridge which he filled with paintings by his father.  His then ex-wife helped promote the salon for an article in The Daily Telegraph. One of Elwes' portraits was of John Bingham, 7th Earl of Lucan, who disappeared in November 1974 after the murder of his children's nanny.

Death
Elwes committed suicide at 1 Stewart's Grove Chelsea with an overdose of barbiturates in 1975, about a month after the death of his father, and about a month before the death of his mother. His body was found by his girlfriend Melissa Wyndham.

Artworks
 1969 – Portrait of John Aspinall
 1970 – Portrait of Min Aspinall & Mushie
 1971 – Portrait of Sir Vivyan (or Vyvian) Edward Naylor-Leyland, 3rd Baronet
 1972 – Portrait of Lord Lucan

Bibliography
 Refer to Drawer: Being a Penetrating Survey of a Shameful National Practice – Hustling. With Nicholas Luard. London: Arthur Barker, 1964.

See also
 Kenneth Tynan
 Mark Birley
 Lady Annabel Goldsmith

External links
The Independent Obituary of Nicholas Luard
The Independent Obituary of Philip Jebb
The New Statesman

References

1931 births
1975 suicides
20th-century English painters
Artists who committed suicide
Barbiturates-related deaths
British Roman Catholics
English male painters
People educated at Downside School
People educated at Ladycross School
People from Billing, Northamptonshire
St. Albans School (Washington, D.C.) alumni
Suicides in Chelsea
Drug-related suicides in England
20th-century English male artists